
This is a list of bridges documented by the Historic American Engineering Record in the U.S. state of West Virginia.

Bridges

See also
List of tunnels documented by the Historic American Engineering Record in West Virginia

References

List
List
West Virginia
Bridges
Bridges